The Elgeseter Line was a tramway line in Trondheim Tramway between Trondheim Torg and Elgeseter. The tram line was built in 1913, expanded in 1923 and abandoned in 1983. It was used by Line 2 operated by Trondheim Sporvei, later Trondheim Trafikkselskap, though part of the line was used by Singsaker Line.

History
Trondheim got its first tram in 1893, and by 1913 an expansion was constructed between the city center and Magnus den Godes Street. At the same time a branch line was built to Trondheim Central Station from Olav Tryggvason's Street. The new line went from the station via the city to Elgeseter. In 1923 the line was expanded to Dalsenget and a depot was constructed there.

When the new Lade Line to Lade was built in 1958 Line 2 was moved from the railway station to Lade and in 1974 the operation of the tramway was taken over by the newly created Trondheim Trafikkselskap. But in 1983 a political compromise was made by the city council, expanding Line 1 from Lademoen to Lade and closing Elgeseter Line and Line 2.

References

Trondheim Tramway lines
Metre gauge railways in Norway
Railway lines opened in 1913
1913 establishments in Norway